Table tennis at the Friendship Games took place in Pyongyang, North Korea between 7 and 20 July 1984. 7 events (3 men's, 3 women's, and mixed play) were contested.

Medal summary

Men's events

Women's events

Mixed events

Medal table

References

Friendship Games
Friendship Games
1984 in North Korean sport
Friendship Games
Table tennis competitions in North Korea
International sports competitions hosted by North Korea
Sport in Pyongyang
1984 in table tennis